The Oberlin Student Cooperative Association (OSCA)  is a non-profit corporation that feeds and houses Oberlin College students. It is located in the town of Oberlin, Ohio, and is independent from but closely tied to Oberlin College. OSCA is the second-largest student housing cooperative in North America, with the largest per-capita of any student co-op.

History

The first Oberlin co-op, Pyle Inn, opened in 1930 but due to poor funding existed only intermittently. By 1949, however, students dissatisfied with the college's dining system chose to revive the cooperative food system. The Inter-Cooperative Council (ICC) was founded in conjunction between Pyle and the newly opened Grey Gables, with a mission to serve as an educational and social committee. By 1962, with the inception of Keep, the ICC became the Oberlin Student Cooperative Association, the largest student-run cooperative in American history.

OSCA flourished for another twenty years, but underwent a critical financial crisis in 1982. OSCA was audited by the IRS and nearly lost its tax-exempt status. This setback caused a rift in the community and instigated the start of several major changes to the cooperative structure.

By 1989, the organization committed to practices of sustainability and environmentalism, purchasing local foods and cooking with more environmentally-friendly practices. In the spring of 2002, OSCA created the institution of COPAO, the Committee on Privilege and Oppression, which explores racial and socio-economic inequality within the cooperative system.

Former member co-ops

Kosher Halal Co-op (KHC), as a part of OSCA, provides at-cost Kosher and Halal food. As of 2013 it is co-managed by Oberlin College's Housing and Dining Office and the campus Hillel chapter.

Operations
OSCA pays rent to the college for use of its buildings but operates almost completely autonomously.  Student members vote by OSCA's consensus process on all rules and implement decisions.

OSCA employs a business coordinator, a financial manager, a food safety advisor, and an office assistant. OSCA members fill other positions within the co-ops, such as OSCA president, education coordinator, head cook, and kitchen prep. Members of OSCA do all of the cooking, cleanup, food buying, composting, and other tasks within their individual co-ops. Each co-op decides at the beginning of each semester how much time members must contribute. For those who hold jobs outside of the co-op, most co-ops will offer "time aid" to significantly reduce the number of co-op hours required. Every member of OSCA must clean up after one meal a week.

Every spring, OSCA members vote for the corporation's officers for the next year. Excluding the chair of the board, these officers, along with the two operations managers, the two cleanliness and maintenance coordinators, one of two education coordinators, the financial manager, the business coordinator, the office assistant, the food safety advisor and the OSCA/Oberlin College Liaison make up the general management team, or the GMT. The GMT deals with the day-to-day operations of the co-ops. The board of directors is made up of two representatives from every co-op as well as the chair of the board. These members then elect which staff positions should also sit on the board.

There are no meal cards or cafeteria trays in co-ops. Communal meals are prepared at least for lunch at 12:20 pm and dinner at 6:20 pm, and the kitchens are open 24/7. Guest policies are set by members so they can bring friends and professors to meals. Many co-ops are vegetarian and vegan-friendly, and allergy awareness among the membership is always a priority.

Principles
{{quote|The principles which guide modern cooperative organizations including OSCA were formulated in 1844 by a group of textile workers in Rochdale, England who were fed up with the exploitative nature of the market during the British Industrial Revolution. They decided to pool their money and open a small retail store which operated on principles which have become the foundation of modern co-ops. The principles laid down by the Rochdale Society of Equitable Pioneers have since been adapted to fit the modern cooperative context. In 1995, the International Cooperative Alliance adopted a revised list of the cooperative principles, which OSCA uses today in a modified form. In 2014, the membership ratified substantial changes to the cooperative principles.

Jobs

All-OSCA Staff 
All members of OSCA equally own and participate in running OSCA. However, there are certain individual leadership roles that function on an all-OSCA level (rather than on an individual co-op level) in order to allow OSCA to function as the large organization that it is. These jobs include four "officer" positions, and a number of All-OSCA student staff positions. Students in these roles oversee different aspects of OSCA. Most positions are elected annually.

Facilities
OSCA operates four coops with housing and dining facilities: Keep, Tank, Old Barrows, and Harkness.  It also has four dining-only co-ops: Fairchild Co-op, Pyle Inn Co-op, Third World Co-op, and the Brown Bag Co-op.  All of these coops are located inside of Oberlin College-owned buildings.

Fairchild Co-op

Fairchild, known on campus and by its members as "Fairkid," is a dining-only co-op that opened in 1977 in the basement of Fairchild Hall. Members are referred to as "Fairkids." Fairchild Hall is a dorm on South Campus and is not affiliated with the co-op. A student survey determined that students were interested in a healthier dining option, so Fairchild opened as an "all-natural" co-op. Its legacy continued as such with a strict food policy that eliminated food such as meat, bananas, and coffee for socio-political reasons reaffirmed by its socially conscious membership each semester. Its membership began a tumblr called The Justice Goats in Spring 2012 in an effort to preserve its history. In Spring 2015 the membership voted to rebuild Fairchild's food policy from the ground up, and as of Spring 2016 discussions are underway regarding a new, less restrictive food policy. Until Spring of 2017, the co-op shared its space with Brown Bag Co-op, a grocery-store style co-op for students living in village or off-campus housing.

Harkness Co-op
Harkness opened in 1950 as a women's dorm, and in September 1967, Harkness became the fourth Oberlin housing and dining co-op. In 1979, Harkness became the first Oberlin co-op to use consensus, a decision process that soon spread throughout OSCA. Also in 1979, Harkness created the Contraceptive Co-op, which eventually transformed into today's Sexual Information Center. For many years, Harkness was also home to the Good Food Co-op, a consumer cooperative that was run and used by both Oberlin College students and Oberlin community members. In the mid-90s, Harkness became the first OSCA co-op to have an elected head cook system.

Centrally located on campus, Harkness houses 64 members, dines 109 and is traditionally vegetarian with vegan options. Harkness has a reputation for being a hub of student activism on campus. Harkness is home to the recently revitalized Oberlin Book Coop.

See also
 List of food cooperatives

References

Food cooperatives in the United States
Student housing cooperatives in the United States
Residential buildings in Ohio
Oberlin College